The City is a book by Max Weber, a German economist and sociologist. It was published posthumously in 1921. In 1924 it was incorporated into a larger book, Economy and Society. An English translation was made in 1958 and several editions have been released since then.

It is likely that Weber compiled that research in 1911–1913, although it contains materials he found before that time.

The analysis of city consists of many different subjects—including study of religion (especially Protestantism), history of development of democracy in Western Europe.

Weber argues that the development of cities in European culture (Occidental cities) as an autonomous associations with its own municipal officials was influenced by such factors as:

 the religion of Christianity
 the privileged legal position of the citizens (based upon citizen's obligation for military service)
 the decline of religious sanctions of kinship solidarity that facilitated creation of unified urban community

That made the city's population easily influenced by later ideas of the Reformers.

In Weber's own words:

See also

 Central place theory

1921 non-fiction books
Sociology books
Works by Max Weber
Books published posthumously